Othmarsingen railway station is a railway station in the municipality of Othmarsingen in the Swiss canton of Aargau. The station is located at the junction of the standard gauge Brugg–Hendschiken, Heitersberg, and Zofingen–Wettingen lines of Swiss Federal Railways.

Services 
The following services stop at Othmarsingen:

 Zürich S-Bahn:
 Aargau S-Bahn:

References

External links 
 
 

Railway stations in the canton of Aargau
Swiss Federal Railways stations